The Torote is a river in Spain, tributary of the Henares. It has its source close to Picorroble hill, in the province of Guadalajara.

See also 
 List of rivers of Spain

Rivers of Spain
Rivers of Castilla–La Mancha
Rivers of the Community of Madrid
Province of Guadalajara
Tributaries of the Henares